Lynne Whitehead is an English international lawn bowler.

Bowls career
She was born in 1973 and won the bronze medal in the pairs with Amy Gowshall at the 2002 Commonwealth Games in Manchester.

In 2007 she won the triples gold medal at the Atlantic Bowls Championships.

She bowls for the Norfolk Bowling Club and has won four English National titles (the 2006 triples and 2006 fours and the junior singles in 1994 & 1998). She subsequently won the 2007 triples and fours at the British Isles Bowls Championships.

References

Living people
1973 births
English female bowls players
Bowls players at the 2002 Commonwealth Games
Commonwealth Games medallists in lawn bowls
Commonwealth Games bronze medallists for England
Medallists at the 2002 Commonwealth Games